Nicholas Denys is an unincorporated community in Gloucester County, New Brunswick, Canada.

Commemorates the career of Nicolas Denys (1598-1688), one of the leading figures in seventeenth-century Acadia.  In 1654 he was appointed governor of the "coasts and ilsands of the Gulf of St. Laurence from Canso to Gaspe".  Died probably at Nepisiguit, in 1688.  Post office from 1940 to 1970.

History

Notable people

See also
List of communities in New Brunswick

References

Communities in Gloucester County, New Brunswick
Designated places in New Brunswick